Nicole Vogel is an American magazine publisher and author. She is the cofounder and publisher of Portland Monthly, a regional magazine covering Portland, Oregon. She received the 2007 Oregon Entrepreneurs Network Entrepreneurship Award for Individual Achievement, the second woman to receive the honor.

Career
Vogel started her publishing career with a job at Leaders Magazine in New York. In 2002, she got a job at Turner Broadcasting, and within three years was the vice president of strategy. Vogel's work for Turner focused specifically on business development for CNN's interactive properties.

In 2001, she and her brother Scott Vogel moved to Portland, Oregon, to be close to their sister Lori, whose husband had been killed in a car accident. While there, they realized the city did not have a regional magazine despite being a large market, so she set out to raise funds to start the magazine. She faced difficulties both for being a woman entrepreneur in a male-dominated industry as well as to start a print publication when circulation for print magazines was declining.

Portland Monthly launched in 2003 along with its parent company Sagacity Media, also co-owned by Nicole Vogel and Scott Vogel, and was profitable by its second issue. In March 2006, she launched Seattle, Washington local magazine Seattle Metropolitan, also under the Sagacity Media parent company. In 2013, she and her brother started Houstonia, the city magazine for Houston, Texas. Sagacity Media also owns titles in Colorado and Utah.

Personal
Vogel is a native of Houston, Texas. She graduated from American University with a degree in justice.

References

American magazine publishers (people)
American University School of Public Affairs alumni
People from Houston
Businesspeople from Portland, Oregon
Living people
Year of birth missing (living people)